Cartiera Mantovana is one of the oldest Italian paper manufacturer founded in 1615 and located in Mantua. Since 17th century it has been operated by the Marenghis, a noble family,  and is now a member of the Henokiens association.

In 2015 the company celebrated 400th anniversary with about 200 employees, today over 50% of its production is exported mainly to European countries.

See also 
List of oldest companies

References 

Article contains translated text from Cartiera Mantovana on the French Wikipedia retrieved on 1 May 2017.

External links 
Homepage
Location on Google Maps.

Papermaking in Italy
Companies established in 1615
1615 establishments in Italy
Henokiens companies